Daraq is a city in Garmeh County, North Khorasan Province, Iran. At the 2006 census, its population was 7236, in 1,645 families.

References

Garmeh County

Cities in North Khorasan Province